Conasprella is a genus  of sea snails, marine gastropod mollusks in the family Conidae, the cone snails and their allies.  This genus was formerly (February 2015) treated by some experts as a member of the family Conilithidae and as an "alternative representation" of this group of species.

Distinguishing characteristics
The Tucker & Tenorio 2009 taxonomy distinguishes Conasprella from Conus in the following ways:

 Genus Conus sensu stricto Linnaeus, 1758
 Shell characters (living and fossil species)
The basic shell shape is conical to elongated conical, has a deep anal notch on the shoulder, a smooth periostracum and a small operculum. The shoulder of the shell is usually nodulose and the protoconch is usually multispiral. Markings often include the presence of tents except for black or white color variants, with the absence of spiral lines of minute tents and textile bars.
Radular tooth (not known for fossil species)
The radula has an elongated anterior section with serrations and a large exposed terminating cusp, a non-obvious waist, blade is either small or absent and has a short barb, and lacks a basal spur.
Geographical distribution
These species are found in the Indo-Pacific region.
Feeding habits
These species eat other gastropods including cones.

 Genus Conasprella Thiele, 1929
Shell characters (living and fossil species)
The protoconch is multispiral with 2.5 whorls, the shell is conical in shape, the spire is elevated, the early whorls have nodules at the periphery.  The body whorl has evenly spaced cords or sulci that reach the midbody to the shoulder, and the whorls may have cords on top.  The anterior notch is absent and the anal notch is deep.  The periostracum is smooth, and the operculum is small.
Radular tooth (not known for fossil species)
The blade is short and covers one-third of the anterior section of the radular tooth.  The posterior blade is absent, a basal spur is present, and the barb is short.  A shaft fold and interior posterior fold is present, however the shaft fold is difficult to detect.
Geographical distribution
These species are found throughout the Indo-Pacific region.
Feeding habits
These species are presumed to be vermivorous (meaning that they prey on marine worms) based upon their radular morphology.

Species list
This list of species is based on the information in the World Register of Marine Species (WoRMS) list. Species within the genus Conasprella include:

According to the 2014 taxonomy, the following species include the following subgenera: Boucheticonus, Coltroconus, Conasprella, Dalliconus, Endemoconus, Fusiconus, Kohniconus, Lilliconus, Parviconus, Pseudoconorbis, and Ximenoconus, as well as Conasprella delessertii (Récluz, 1843), a species "incertae sedes". These subgenera are accepted and are considered alternative representations.

 Conasprella aculeiformis (Reeve, 1844)
 Conasprella agassizi (Dall, 1886)
 Conasprella ageri Hendricks, 2015
 Conasprella alexandremonteiroi (Cossignani, 2014)
 Conasprella alisi (Moolenbeek, Röckel & Richard, 1995)
 Conasprella allamandi (Petuch, 2013)
 Conasprella anacarolinae Cossignani, 2019
 Conasprella anaglyptica (Crosse, 1865)
 Conasprella aphrodite (Petuch, 1979)
 Conasprella aquitanica (Mayer, 1858)
 Conasprella arawak (Petuch & R. F. Myers, 2014)
 Conasprella arcuata (Broderip & G. B. Sowerby I, 1829)
 Conasprella armiger (Crosse, 1858)
 Conasprella articulata (G. B. Sowerby II, 1873)
 Conasprella aturensis (Peyrot, 1931)
 Conasprella baccata (G. B. Sowerby III, 1877)
 Conasprella baileyi (Röckel & da Motta, 1979)
 Conasprella bajanensis (Nowell-Usticke, 1968)
 Conasprella berschaueri (Petuch & R. F. Myers, 2014)
 Conasprella berwerthi (Hoernes & Auinger, 1879)
 Conasprella bianchii (Petuch & Berschauer, 2018)
 Conasprella boholensis (Petuch, 1979)
 Conasprella booti (Petuch, Berschauer & Poremski, 2017)
 Conasprella boriqua (Petuch, Berschauer & Poremski, 2016)
 Conasprella boucheti (Richard, 1983)
 Conasprella bozzettii (Lauer, 1991)
 Conasprella burckhardti (Böse, 1906)
 Conasprella carlagrezziae (Petuch, Coltro & Berschauer, 2020)
 Conasprella carvalhoi (Petuch & Berschauer, 2017)
 Conasprella centurio (Born, 1778)
 Conasprella cercadensis (Maury, 1917)
 Conasprella chaac (Petuch, Berschauer & Poremski, 2017)
 Conasprella chinchorroensis (Petuch, Berschauer & Poremski, 2017)
 Conasprella coletteae (Petuch, 2013)
 Conasprella comatosa (Pilsbry, 1904)
 Conasprella coriolisi (Moolenbeek & Richard, 1995)
 Conasprella coromandelica (E. A. Smith, 1894)
 Conasprella crabosi (Petuch & Berschauer, 2018)
 Conasprella culebrana (Petuch, Berschauer & Poremski, 2016)
 Conasprella damasoi (Cossignani, 2007)
 Conasprella damasomonteiroi (Petuch & Myers, 2014)
 Conasprella delessertii (Récluz, 1843)
 Conasprella dictator (Melvill, 1898)
 Conasprella dieteri (Moolenbeek, Zandbergen & Bouchet, 2008)
 Conasprella edpetuchi (Monnier, Limpalaër, Roux & Berschauer, 2015)
 Conasprella elegans (G. B. Sowerby III, 1895)
 Conasprella elokismenos (Kilburn, 1975)
 Conasprella emarginata (Reeve, 1844)
 Conasprella ericmonnieri (Petuch & R. F. Myers, 2014)
 Conasprella eucoronata (G. B. Sowerby III, 1903)
 Conasprella eugrammata (Bartsch & Rehder, 1943)
 Conasprella fenzani (Petuch & Sargent, 2011)
 Conasprella ferreirai (Petuch & Berschauer, 2017)
 Conasprella fijiensis (Moolenbeek, Röckel & Bouchet, 2008)
 Conasprella fluviamaris (Petuch & Sargent, 2011)
 Conasprella geeraertsi (Poppe & Tagaro, 2017)
 Conasprella gordyi (Röckel & Bondarev, 2000)
 Conasprella gregorioi (Crabos & G. S. P. Oliveira, 2021)
 Conasprella grohi (Tenorio & Poppe, 2004)
 Conasprella gubernatrix (Petuch & Berschauer, 2018)
 Conasprella guidopoppei (G. Raybaudi Massilia, 2005)
 Conasprella henckesi (Coltro, 2004)
 Conasprella henriquei (Petuch & R. F. Myers, 2014)
 Conasprella herndli (Petuch & R. F. Myers, 2014)
 Conasprella hivana (Moolenbeek, Zandbergen & Bouchet, 2008)
 Conasprella hopwoodi (Tomlin, 1937)
 Conasprella howelli (Iredale, 1929)
 Conasprella iansa (Petuch, 1979)
 Conasprella icapui (Petuch & Berschauer, 2018)
 Conasprella ichinoseana (Kuroda, 1956)
 Conasprella imitator (A. P. Brown & Pilsbry, 1911)
 Conasprella insculpta (Kiener, 1847)
 Conasprella ione (Fulton, 1938)
 Conasprella itapua (Petuch & Berschauer, 2018)
 Conasprella ixchel (Petuch, Berschauer & Poremski, 2017)
 Conasprella janapatriceae (Petuch, Berschauer & Poremski, 2016)
 Conasprella janowskyae (J. K. Tucker & Tenorio, 2011)
 Conasprella jaspidea (Gmelin, 1791)
 Conasprella joanae (Petuch & Berschauer, 2018)
 Conasprella joliveti (Moolenbeek, Röckel & Bouchet, 2008)
 Conasprella josei (Petuch & Berschauer, 2016)
 Conasprella kantangana (da Motta, 1982)
 Conasprella kellyae (Petuch, Berschauer & Poremski, 2017)
 Conasprella keppensi (Petuch & Berschauer, 2018)
 Conasprella kimioi (Habe, 1965)
 Conasprella kitteredgei (Maury, 1917)
 Conasprella kohni (McLean & Nybakken, 1979)
 Conasprella laudelinoi (Crabos & G. S. P. Oliveira, 2021)
 Conasprella lemuriana Monnier, Tenorio, Bouchet & Puillandre, 2018
 Conasprella lenhilli (Cargile, 1998)
 Conasprella lentiginosa (Reeve, 1844)
 Conasprella levenensis (Monnier & Tenorio, 2017)
 Conasprella lindapowersae (Petuch & Berschauer, 2017)
 Conasprella lizarum (Raybaudi Massilia & da Motta, 1992)
 Conasprella longurionis (Kiener, 1847)
 Conasprella lorenzi Monnier & Limpalaër, 2012
 Conasprella lucida (W. Wood, 1828)
 Conasprella lusca (Petuch, Berschauer & Poremski, 2017)
 Conasprella mahogani (Reeve, 1843)
 Conasprella marcusi (Petuch, Berschauer & Poremski, 2016)
 Conasprella marinae (Petuch & Myers, 2014)
 Conasprella masinoi (Petuch, Berschauer & Poremski, 2016)
 Conasprella mazei (Deshayes, 1874)
 Conasprella mcgintyi (Pilsbry, 1955)
 Conasprella memiae (Habe & Kosuge, 1970)
 Conasprella mindana (Hwass in Bruguière, 1792)
 Conasprella minutissima Harzhauser & Landau, 2016
 Conasprella nereis (Petuch, 1979)
 Conasprella ogum (Petuch & R. F. Myers, 2014)
 Conasprella olangoensis (Poppe & Tagaro, 2017)
 Conasprella orbignyi (Audouin, 1831)
 Conasprella otohimeae (Kuroda & Itô, 1961)
 Conasprella pacei (Petuch, 1987)
 Conasprella pagoda (Kiener, 1847)
 Conasprella paumotu (Rabiller & Richard, 2014)
 Conasprella pepeiu (Moolenbeek, Zandbergen & Bouchet, 2008)
 Conasprella perplexa (G. B. Sowerby II, 1857)
 Conasprella pfluegeri (Petuch, 2003)
 Conasprella philippequiquandoni (Cossignani, 2019)
 Conasprella pomponeti (Petuch & Myers, 2014)
 Conasprella poremskii (Petuch & R. F. Myers, 2014)
 Conasprella prugnaudorum (Petuch & Berschauer, 2018)
 Conasprella pseudokimioi (da Motta & Martin, 1982)
 Conasprella pseudorbignyi (Röckel & Lan, 1981)
 Conasprella puncticulata (Hwass in Bruguière, 1792)
 Conasprella pusio (Hwass in Bruguière, 1792)
 Conasprella rachelae (Petuch, 1988)
 Conasprella rainesae (McGinty, 1953)
 Conasprella ramalhoi (Coomans, Moolenbeek & Wils, 1986)
 Conasprella ramosorum (Petuch & Berschauer, 2019)
 Conasprella raoulensis (Powell, 1958)
 Conasprella roatanensis (Petuch & Sargent, 2011)
 Conasprella roberti (Richard, 2009)
 Conasprella rutila (Menke, 1843)
 Conasprella saecularis (Melvill, 1898)
 Conasprella sargenti (Petuch, 2013)
 Conasprella sauros (Garcia, 2006)
 Conasprella scaripha (Dall, 1910)
 Conasprella schirrmeisteri (Coltro, 2004)
 Conasprella serafimi (Petuch & Berschauer, 2019)
 Conasprella sieboldii (Reeve, 1848)
 Conasprella simonei (Petuch & R. F. Myers, 2014)
 Conasprella somalica (Bozzetti, 2013)
 Conasprella spirofilis (Habe & Kosuge, 1970)
 Conasprella stearnsii (Conrad, 1869)
 Conasprella stenostoma (G. B. Sowerby I, 1850)
 Conasprella stocki (Coomans & Moolenbeek, 1990)
 Conasprella tammymyersae (Petuch & Berschauer, 2019)
 Conasprella subturrita (d'Orbigny, 1852)
 Conasprella tayrona (Petuch, Berschauer & Poremski, 2017)
 Conasprella tiki (Moolenbeek, Zandbergen & Bouchet, 2008)
 Conasprella tirardi (Röckel & Moolenbeek, 1996)
 Conasprella toincabrali (Petuch & Berschauer, 2019)
 Conasprella torensis (Sturany, 1903)
 Conasprella tornata (G. B. Sowerby I, 1833)
 Conasprella traceyi (J. K. Tucker & Stahlschmidt, 2010)
 Conasprella traversiana (E. A. Smith, 1875)
 Conasprella valianti (Petuch, Coltro & Berschauer, 2020)
 Conasprella vanhyningi (Rehder, 1944)
 Conasprella vantwoudti (Petuch, Berschauer & Poremski, 2015)
 Conasprella viminea (Reeve, 1849)
 Conasprella wakayamaensis (Kuroda, 1956)
 Conasprella wendrosi (Tenorio & Afonso, 2013)
 Conasprella ximenes (Gray, 1839)

The following species were brought into synonymy:
 Conasprella albobrunnea Bozzetti, 2017: synonym of Conasprella eucoronata (G. B. Sowerby III, 1903)
 Conasprella biraghii (G. Raybaudi Massilia, 1992): synonym of Lilliconus biraghii (G. Raybaudi Massilia, 1992)
 Conasprella cancellata Hwass in Bruguière, 1792: synonym of Conus cancellatus Hwass in Bruguière, 1792
 Conasprella guyanensis (Van Mol, 1973): synonym of Conasprella bajanensis (Nowell-Usticke, 1968)
 Conasprella hivanus (Moolenbeek, Zandbergen & Bouchet, 2008): synonym of Conasprella hivana (Moolenbeek, Zandbergen & Bouchet, 2008) (wrong gender agreement of specific epithet)
 Conasprella hypochlorus (Tomlin, 1937): synonym of Conasprella insculpta (Kiener, 1847)
 Conasprella sagei (Korn & G. Raybaudi Massilia, 1993): synonym of Lilliconus sagei (Korn & G. Raybaudi Massilia, 1993)

List of synonyms of the genus Conasprella
 Bathyconus Tucker & Tenorio, 2009
 Boucheticonus Tucker & Tenorio, 2013
 Coltroconus Petuch, 2013
 Conasprella (Boucheticonus) Tucker & Tenorio, 2013 · accepted, alternate representation
 Conasprella (Coltroconus) Petuch, 2013 · accepted, alternate representation
 Conasprella (Conasprella) Thiele, 1929 · accepted, alternate representation
 Conasprella (Dalliconus) Tucker & Tenorio, 2009 · accepted, alternate representation
 Conasprella (Endemoconus) Iredale, 1931 · accepted, alternate representation
 Conasprella (Fusiconus) da Motta, 1991 · accepted, alternate representation
 Conasprella (Kohniconus) Tucker & Tenorio, 2009 · accepted, alternate representation
 Conasprella (Lilliconus) G. Raybaudi Massilia, 1994 · accepted, alternate representation
 Conasprella (Parviconus) Cotton & Godfrey, 1932 · accepted, alternate representation
 Conasprella (Pseudoconorbis) Tucker & Tenorio, 2009 · accepted, alternate representation
 Conasprella (Ximeniconus) Emerson & Old, 1962 · accepted, alternate representation
 Conus (Conasprella) Thiele, 1929
 Dalliconus Tucker & Tenorio, 2009
 Duodenticonus Tucker & Tenorio, 2013
 Endemoconus Iredale, 1931
 Fumiconus da Motta, 1991
 Fusiconus da Motta, 1991
 Globiconus Tucker & Tenorio, 2009
 Jaspidiconus Petuch, 2003
 Kermasprella Powell, 1958
 Kohniconus Tucker & Tenorio, 2009
 Lilliconus G. Raybaudi Massilia, 1994
 Mamiconus Cotton & Godfrey, 1932
 Parviconus Cotton & Godfrey, 1932
 Perplexiconus Tucker & Tenorio, 2009
 Pseudoconorbis Tucker & Tenorio, 2009
 Viminiconus Tucker & Tenorio, 2009
 Ximeniconus Emerson & Old, 1962
 Yeddoconus Tucker & Tenorio, 2009

Significance of "alternative representation"
Prior to 2009, all cone species were placed within the family Conidae and were placed in one genus, Conus. In 2009 however, J.K. Tucker and M.J. Tenorio proposed a classification system for the over 600 recognized species that were in the family. Their classification proposed 3 distinct families and 82 genera for the living species of cone snails, including the family Conilithidae. This classification was based upon shell morphology, radular differences, anatomy, physiology, cladistics, with comparisons to molecular (DNA) studies. Published accounts of genera within the Conidae (or Conilithidae) that include the genus Conasprella include J.K. Tucker & M.J. Tenorio (2009), and Bouchet et al. (2011).

Testing in order to try to understand the molecular phylogeny of the Conidae was initially begun by Christopher Meyer and Alan Kohn, and is continuing, particularly with the advent of nuclear DNA testing in addition to mDNA testing.

However, in 2011, some experts preferred to use the traditional classification, where all species are placed in Conus within the single family Conidae: for example, according to the November 2011 version of the World Register of Marine Species, all species within the family Conidae are in the genus Conus. The binomial names of species in the 82 cone snail genera listed in Tucker & Tenorio 2009 are recognized by the World Register of Marine Species as "alternative representations."  Debate within the scientific community regarding this issue continues, and additional molecular phylogeny studies are being carried out in an attempt to clarify the issue.

All this has been superseded in 2015 by the new classification of the Conidae

References

 Tucker J.K. & Tenorio M.J. (2013) Illustrated catalog of the living cone shells. 517 pp. Wellington, Florida: MdM Publishing.

Further reading 
 Kohn A. A. (1992). Chronological Taxonomy of Conus, 1758-1840". Smithsonian Institution Press, Washington and London.
 Monteiro A. (ed.) (2007). The Cone Collector 1: 1-28.
 Berschauer D. (2010). Technology and the Fall of the Mono-Generic Family The Cone Collector 15: pp. 51-54
 Puillandre N., Meyer C.P., Bouchet P., and Olivera B.M. (2011), Genetic divergence and geographical variation in the deep-water Conus orbignyi complex (Mollusca: Conoidea)'', Zoologica Scripta 40(4) 350-363.

External links
 To World Register of Marine Species
  Gastropods.com: Conidae setting forth the genera recognized therein.
  Gastropods.com: Conilithidae setting forth the genera recognized therein.

 
Conidae